Tymoshenko Government may refer to:

 First Tymoshenko Government, February 2005 to September 2005
 Second Tymoshenko Government, December 2007 to March 2010